Niupani  is a village in the Solomon Islands, on Rennell Island in the Rennell and Bellona province.

Location
This village is on the Eastern side of Lake Tegano and accessible by boat in approximately 30 minutes, or a walk to the village from the road end takes about an hour.  Approximately 50 km, 3hr drive from Tingoa.

Population
250 people approximately

Religion
South Seas Evangelical Church (SSEC)

Police
Generally policing is serviced by the Tigoa police station as well as a local Provincial government employed area Constable.

This village is split due to a land dispute that has been going on for over 10 years

Populated places in Rennell and Bellona Province